The Flute Concerto is a composition for solo flute and orchestra by the American composer Elliott Carter.  The work was commissioned by Elena Bashkirova for the Jerusalem International Chamber Music.  Carter began the composition in September 2007 and completed it in March 2008 at the age of 99.  The piece was first performed at the Jerusalem International YMCA on September 9, 2008 by the flutist Emmanuel Pahud and the Jerusalem International Chamber Music Ensemble under the conductor Daniel Barenboim.

Composition
The Flute Concerto has a duration of roughly 13 minutes.  Carter described the origins of the piece in the score program note, writing:

Instrumentation
The work is scored for a solo flute and reduced orchestra comprising another flute (doubling piccolo), oboe (doubling cor anglais), two clarinets (second doubling bass clarinet), bassoon (doubling contrabassoon), two horns, trumpet, trombone, percussion, harp, piano, and strings.

Reception
The Flute Concerto has been praised by music critics.  Reviewing the North American premiere of the piece, Jeremy Eichler of The Boston Globe wrote:
Anthony Tommasini of The New York Times similarly lauded the work as "rhapsodic and brilliant" and wrote, "It opens with startling, crisp orchestral chords that prod the flute into scurrying figures, quickly taken up by other instruments. The flute's skittish riffs and winding lyrical lines sometimes ignite agitated orchestral responses; at other times they are cushioned by subdued, sustained harmonies. Even when the music breaks into a jumpy back-and-forth, the mood is industrious, not aggressive."  He continued, "Mr. Carter's language has lost none of its piercing, atonal bite. Yet like most of his works from his 90s and later, this score is less densely complex and layered than those from earlier decades. The enhanced clarity is a welcome turn, making it easier to hear Mr. Carter’s scintillating sonorities, myriad instrumental colors and complex rhythmic interplay."
Lisa Hirsch of the San Francisco Classical Voice wrote, "About 15 minutes long and for a smallish orchestra that nonetheless includes a colorful percussion section, a harp, and a piano, it’s a lovely and challenging showpiece for the flutist."

References

Concertos by Elliott Carter
2008 compositions
Carter